The 1999 Toyota Princess Cup doubles was the tennis doubles event of the third edition of the first hardcourt tournament after the US Open. Anna Kournikova and Monica Seles were the defending champions, but neither competed this time.

Conchita Martínez and Patricia Tarabini won their second event of the year, defeating Amanda Coetzer and Jelena Dokic in the final.

Seeds

Draw

Qualifying

Seeds

Qualifiers
  Haruka Inoue /  Maiko Inoue

Qualifying draw

References
 ITF singles results page

Doubles
Toyota Princess Cup - Doubles